Lee Kyu-hyun (Korean: 이규현, born October 15, 1980) is a South Korean former competitive figure skater. He is an eight-time (1997–2003) South Korean national champion. He represented South Korea at the 1998 Winter Olympics and the 2002 Winter Olympics, placing 24th and 28th, respectively. His highest placement at an ISU Championship was 8th at the 1997 World Junior Championships. He is the brother of speed skater Lee Kyou-hyuk.

Programs

Results
JGP: Junior Series / Junior Grand Prix

References

External links
 

South Korean male single skaters
Figure skaters at the 2002 Winter Olympics
Figure skaters at the 1998 Winter Olympics
Olympic figure skaters of South Korea
1980 births
Figure skaters from Seoul
Living people
Figure skaters at the 1999 Asian Winter Games
Figure skaters at the 2003 Asian Winter Games
Competitors at the 2003 Winter Universiade